Serra Pelada meteorite is a meteorite found in Curionópolis, in the state of the Pará, Brazil. Its fall was observed on June 29, 2017, by people in Eldorado dos Carajás, Marabá and Parauapebas. Many students and a lookout, Manuel da Silva, of the Escola Rita Lima de Souza, heard a series of four to 6 detonations and a few minutes later witnessed a rock falling on the road near the school.

Overview
Studies by researchers from Bahia, Pará, Rio de Janeiro and São Paulo indicated that it was a rare type of meteorite, which must have come off one of the largest and brightest asteroids in the Solar System, 4 Vesta.

See also 
 Glossary of meteoritics
 Serra Pelada

References

External links 
 Meteoritos Brasil - Serra Pelada

Meteorites found in Brazil